Holli Dempsey (born 11 May 1990) is an English actress and comedian. She played Vicky in Ricky Gervais's Derek and Vera in the 2016 film version of Dad’s Army.

Career
Dempsey was trained in Joan Littlewood improvisation style as part of the junior group at Theatre Royal Stratford East.

Dempsey is known for having played Holly in the TV series The Aliens, Emily Lacey in the TV series Harlots and has appeared in ITV's Plebs.

She has also appeared in BBC's Call the Midwife as prostitute 'Bridget Cole' and ITV’s The Delivery Man and The Ice Cream Girls an ITV drama based on the novel by Dorothy Koomson. Dempsey also appears in the 2015 British comedy film Aaaaaaaah! directed by Steve Oram.

In 2016, she appeared in "Hated in the Nation", an episode of the anthology series Black Mirror.

Filmography

Film

Television

References

External links
 

Living people
21st-century British actresses
English television actresses
21st-century English women
21st-century English people
1990 births